Nicolò Marcello (c. 1399 – 1 December 1474) was the 69th Doge of Venice, elected in 1473. He held office for a short period, from 13 August 1473 to 1 December 1474. Said to have been inspired by a previous painting dating from the 15th century, Titian painted Nicolo Marcello's portrait long after his death.

Life 

Born a member of the Marcello family, Nicolò was a trader with the Orient before he undertook various important public positions in the Republic of Venice such as provost of the Council of Ten, ducal councillor, and procurator of St Mark's. Marcello married twice: first with Bianca Barbarigo and later with Contarina Contarini, with whom he had a daughter.

Doge 

In the 1473 election for doge, Marcello prevailed against the future doges Pietro Mocenigo and Andrea Vendramin. During his brief reign he devoted himself to reorganizing Venice's state finances. He introduced new silver coins that were called Marcello. In his will Marcello bequeathed most of his wealth to charitable ventures.

Tomb 

Upon his death, a funeral monument was designed by the artist Pietro Lombardo (c. 1435-1515) and erected in the Santa Marina church. When the church was deconsecrated in 1818, the monument was moved to the Basilica dei Santi Giovanni e Paolo. The question of where the burial took place is controversial.

References 

1390s births
1474 deaths
Year of birth uncertain
15th-century Doges of Venice
Procurators of Saint Mark
Burials at Santi Giovanni e Paolo, Venice